Lin Jong (born 4 June 1993) is a former Australian rules footballer who played for the Western Bulldogs in the Australian Football League (AFL). He was recruited by the club in the 2012 Rookie Draft, with pick 9. He was the first Australian of East Timorese and Taiwanese descent to play in the AFL.

Early years
Lin's father, Vitor, an East Timorese of Chinese background, fled his country in 1978 at the age of 18 due to the civil war. He worked and studied in Japan, Macau, Hong Kong, and finally Taiwan, where he met his wife Faye. After marrying, they immigrated to Australia in 1985.

Jong was born in Melbourne, Australia, on 4 June 1993. He attended school at Brentwood Secondary College and played with the Glen Waverley Rovers JFC.

AFL career
Jong made his debut in Round 20, 2012, against  at the Melbourne Cricket Ground.

In 2014, Jong was promoted to the senior list and also signed to a new contract, tying him to the club until the end of 2016.

In 2016, Jong cracked his collarbone in the Western Bulldogs' elimination final victory over West Coast. Despite this injury, Jong earned a Norm Goss Memorial Medal seventeen days later by putting in a best-on-ground effort for his club's reserves team in its victory over the Casey Scorpions in the 2016 VFL Grand Final. In a successful ploy to avoid contact with his injury, Jong took inspiration from Footscray legend Charlie Sutton by taping the opposite shoulder.

After suffering a serious hamstring injury in Round 6 of the 2021 AFL Season, Jong announced his retirement from the AFL on 4 August 2021.

Post-AFL career 
At least as early as 2016, Jong had expressed interest in becoming a primary school teacher. In 2017, he had commenced studying to become a primary school teacher, and he had commenced his teaching placement in 2021.

References

External links

 

1993 births
Living people
Western Bulldogs players
Australian sportspeople of Chinese descent
Australian rules footballers from Melbourne
Australian people of East Timorese descent
Australian people of Taiwanese descent
Oakleigh Chargers players
Williamstown Football Club players